Dehzanun (also Romanized as Dehzanūn; also known as Dehzanān) is a village in Darreh Kayad Rural District, Sardasht District, Dezful County, Khuzestan Province, Iran. At the 2006 census, its population was 104, in 19 families.

References 

Populated places in Dezful County